William Samuel Deacon (3 May 1828 – 4 March 1903) was an English first-class cricketer and banker.

Deacon was born at Battersea in May 1828. He was educated at Eton College, before going up to Trinity College, Cambridge. In his freshman year of 1847 at Cambridge, he made his debut in first-class cricket for the Gentlemen of Kent against the Gentlemen of England at Canterbury. The following year he made his debut for Cambridge University against Cambridge Townsmen, with Deacon playing first-class cricket for Cambridge from 1848 to 1850, making nine appearances. In these nine matches, he scored 250 runs at an average of 16.66 and with a high score of 54. In addition to playing first-class cricket for the university, Decon also made a single appearance for a combined Oxford and Cambridge Universities team against the Gentlemen of England in 1848. Alongside a further two appearances for the Gentlemen of Kent, Deacon made thirteen appearances in first-class cricket. Described by Wisden Cricketers' Almanack as a “fine free hitter”, he scored 328 runs in these matches at an average of 14.90, with one half century score. He captained Cambridge University in 1850, gaining a blue in 1848, 1849 and 1850.

By profession a banker, Deacon died at Cobham in March 1903.

References

External links

1828 births
1903 deaths
People from Battersea
People educated at Eton College
Alumni of Trinity College, Cambridge
English cricketers
Gentlemen of Kent cricketers
Cambridge University cricketers
Oxford and Cambridge Universities cricketers
English bankers
19th-century English businesspeople